Jonathan C. Linton (born November 7, 1974) is a former American football running back with the Buffalo Bills of the National Football League.

Linton was born in Allentown, Pennsylvania on November 7, 1974 and played high school football at Catasauqua High School in Catasauqua, Pennsylvania. He played college football at the University of North Carolina in Chapel Hill, North Carolina.

National Football League
In 1998, Linton was drafted in the fifth round of the NFL Draft by the Buffalo Bills. He played for the Bills in the 1998, 1999, and 2000 seasons.

References

1974 births
Living people
Catasauqua High School alumni
Sportspeople from Allentown, Pennsylvania
Players of American football from Pennsylvania
American football fullbacks
North Carolina Tar Heels football players
Buffalo Bills players